The Dragon Lord is a novel by Peter Morwood published in 1986.

Plot summary
The Dragon Lord is a novel in which there are shifting alliances and betrayals involving the Code of Honour.

Reception
Dave Langford reviewed The Dragon Lord for White Dwarf #83, and stated that "Near the end, drama is dispelled by the in-joke of a cameo appearance by Anne ("Aiyyan") McCaffrey, reciting from her own books. This kind of thing should be left to Terry Pratchett."

Reviews
Review by Pauline Morgan (1987) in Fantasy Review, January-February 1987
Review by Paul J. McAuley (1987) in Vector 138

References

1986 novels